The Lanzhou–Qinghai railway, abbreviated as the Lanqing railway was built as the first step of an ambitious plan set by the People's Republic of China to connect Tibet with the rest of China by railway. LanQing railway, designed in 1956 and built from May 1958 to September 1959, runs 188 Kilometers long, connecting Lanzhou, the capital city of Gansu province, and Xining, the capital city of Qinghai province. 

The second step of the original plan is the Qingzang railway, a 1956-kilometer railroad that starts from Xining, first runs west bound to the city of Golmud, also in Qinghai province, and then runs south bound towards Tibet and finally ends in Lhasa. This plan proved to be very challenging as the Qinghai-Tibet plateau is some of the highest terrain in the world. The segment between Xining and Golmud, measured 814 kilometers long, was completed in 1979, and became operational in 1984. However, the final segment of the QingZang railway, from Golmud to Lhasa, was put on hold for almost two decades due to the high elevation and complex terrain of the region. This project was revived again in 2001, and was finally completed in October 2005. After signalling work and track testing it was inaugurated on 1 July 2006.

Until the opening of the Lanzhou–Xinjiang high-speed railway in 2014, the Lanzhou–Qinghai railway was the only railway that connected the Qinghai-Tibet region with the rest of China. The easternmost section of the high-speed railway, from Lanzhou to Xining, runs roughly parallel to the Lanqing railway.

See also

Rail transport in the People's Republic of China
List of railways in China

Railway lines in China
Rail transport in Gansu
Rail transport in Qinghai
Railway lines opened in 1959